Malene Haukøy (born 12 July 1991) is a Norwegian ski mountaineer, trail runner and member of the national selection.

Haukøy was born in Kyrkjebø. She started ski mountaineering at the age of 15 years. Besides several notable results in juniors' class rankings, she placed twice in the seniors' top ten rankings by participating in relay events at the 2010 and 2011 World Championships.

Haukøy currently lives in Sogndalsfjøra. Her younger brother Eirik also competes in ski mountaineering races.

Selected results 
 2010: 6th, World Championship, relay, together with Marit Tveite Bystøl and Oddrun Brakstad Orset
 2011: 8th, World Championship, relay, together with Ingvild Ryggen Carstens and Mari Fasting
 2016: 5th, Altitoy-Ternua, together with Ida Nilsson

External links 
 Photo, EM 2012

References 

1991 births
Living people
Norwegian female ski mountaineers
People from Høyanger
Sportspeople from Vestland